Tamarine Tanasugarn was the defending champion, but withdrew before the event started.

Casey Dellacqua won the title, defeating Monique Adamczak in the final, 6–4, 6–1.

Seeds

Main draw

Finals

Top half

Bottom half

References 
 Main draw
 Qualifying draw

Fukuoka International Women's Cup - Singles
Fukuoka International Women's Cup